Causeway Hospital  is an acute general hospital in Coleraine, County Londonderry, Northern Ireland. It is managed by the Northern Health and Social Care Trust.

History
The hospital, which replaced Coleraine Hospital and the Route Hospital in Ballymoney, was built at a cost of £55 million. It was officially opened by First Minister David Trimble and Deputy First Minister Mark Durkan in April 2002. In February 2003 it was designated as one of the nine acute hospitals in the acute hospital network of Northern Ireland on which healthcare would be focused under the government health policy 'Developing Better Services'.

References

Northern Health and Social Care Trust
Hospitals established in 2002
2002 establishments in Ireland
Health and Social Care (Northern Ireland) hospitals
Hospitals in County Londonderry